Ercole Sassonia, also known as Hercules de Saxonia, Hercules Saxonia Patavinus,  or Hercules of Saxony (1551 – August 29, 1607), was an Italian physician.

Sassoonia was born and died in Padua, and was one of the great Italian clinicians of the Renaissance.  He was educated in his hometown, and graduated with a degree in medicine from the University of Padua. In 1575 he became the professor of medical practice at the university.  Becoming famous as a teacher, he was invited to Vienna by  Emperor Maximilian II, where he remained until 1600.  His chief scientific works were in the fields of diagnostics, skin diseases, and venereal diseases.

Chief works
 , Padova, Paulum Meiettum, 1591.
 , 1593.
 , Padova, Paulum Meiettum, 1597.
 , Padova, Officina Laurentii Pasquati, 1600.
 , 1607.
 , 1620.

Bibliography
 Castiglioni A.,: Storia della Medicina, II, Mondadori, Milano, 1948.
 Pazzini A.,: Storia della Medicina, I, Società Editrice Libraria, Milano, 1947, pp. 697, 698.
 Voce:  Ercole Sassonia  in Enciclopedia Italiana,  XXX,     Istituto della Enciclopedia Italiana, Roma, 1936, p. 896.
 Voce Ercole Sassonia  in Enciclopedia Biografica Universale Treccani,  XXVII,  p. 250,   Istituto della Enciclopedia Italiana, Roma, 2007.

External links
 Ercole Sassonia, Prognoseion practicarum libri duo (1620)
Ercole Sassonia, Opera Practica (1639)
Ercole Sassonia, Luis venereae perfectissimus tractatus, (1597)

Translated from the Italian Wikipedia

1551 births
1607 deaths
16th-century Italian physicians
University of Padua alumni
Academic staff of the University of Padua